This is a list of militaries by country, including main branches of ground, naval and air forces.

A

Afghanistan
Afghan Armed Forces
Afghan Army
Afghan Air Force

Albania
Albanian Armed Forces
Albanian  Air Force
Albanian Land Force
Albanian Naval Force
Military Police

Algeria
Algerian People's National Army
Algerian Land Forces
Algerian National Navy
Algerian Air Force
Territorial Air Defence Forces
Republican Guard

Angola
Angolan Armed Forces
Angolan Army
Angolan Navy
National Air Force of Angola

Antigua and Barbuda
Antigua and Barbuda Defence Force
Antigua and Barbuda Regiment
Antigua and Barbuda Coast Guard
Antigua and Barbuda Cadet Corps
Service and Support Battalion

Argentina
Armed Forces of the Argentine Republic
Argentine Army
Argentine Air Force
Argentine Navy

Armenia
Armed Forces of Armenia
Armenian Ground Forces
Armenian Air Force

Australia
Australian Defence Force
Royal Australian Air Force
Australian Army
Royal Australian Navy

Austria
Austrian Armed Forces
Austrian Army
Austrian Air Force
Jagdkommando

Azerbaijan
Azerbaijani Armed Forces
Azerbaijani Air Forces
Azerbaijani Land Forces
Azerbaijani Navy

B

The Bahamas
Royal Bahamas Defence Force

Bahrain
Bahrain Defence Force
Royal Bahraini Air Force
Royal Bahraini Army
Royal Bahrain Naval Force
Bahrain Royal Medical Services
Royal Guard

Bangladesh
Bangladesh Armed Forces
Bangladesh Air Force
Bangladesh Army
Bangladesh Navy

Barbados
Barbados Defence Force
Barbados Regiment
Barbados Coast Guard
Barbados Air Wing

Belarus
Armed Forces of Belarus
Belarusian Ground Forces
Belarusian Air Force
Special Forces of Belarus
Belarusian Transport Troops
Belarusian Territorial Troops

Belgium
Belgian Armed Forces
Belgian Land Component
Belgian Air Component
Belgian Navy
Belgian Medical Component

Belize
Belize Defence Force
Belize Coast Guard
Belize Defence Force Air Wing

Benin
Benin Armed Forces
Benin Army
Benin Navy
Benin Air Force
National Gendarmerie

Bhutan
Military of Bhutan
Royal Bhutan Army
Royal Bodyguard of Bhutan
Royal Bhutan Police

Bolivia
Armed Forces of Bolivia
Bolivian Army
Bolivian Air Force
Bolivian Navy

Bosnia and Herzegovina
Armed Forces of Bosnia and Herzegovina
Bosnian Ground Forces
Air Force and Anti-Aircraft Defence of Bosnia and Herzegovina

Botswana
Botswana Defence Force
Botswana Ground Force
Botswana Defence Force Air Wing

Brazil
Brazilian Armed Forces
Brazilian Army
Brazilian Air Force
Brazilian Navy

Brunei
Royal Brunei Armed Forces
Royal Brunei Land Forces
Royal Brunei Air Force
Royal Brunei Navy

Bulgaria
Bulgarian Armed Forces
Bulgarian Land Forces
Bulgarian Air Force
Bulgarian Navy
National Guards Unit of Bulgaria

Burkina Faso
Burkina Faso Armed Forces
Army of Burkina Faso
Air Force of Burkina Faso
National Gendarmerie
People's Militia

Burundi
National Defence Force

C

Cambodia
Royal Cambodian Armed Forces
Royal Cambodian Army
Royal Cambodian Air Force
Royal Cambodian Navy
Royal Gendarmerie of Cambodia

Cameroon
Cameroon Armed Forces
Cameroon Air Force

Canada
Canadian Armed Forces
Canadian Army
Royal Canadian Air Force
Royal Canadian Navy

Cape Verde
Cape Verdean Armed Forces
Cape Verdean National Guard
Cape Verdean Coast Guard
Cape Verdean Air Force

Central African Republic
Central African Armed Forces
Central African Republic Air Force

Chad
Chad National Army
Chadian Air Force
Chadian Ground Forces
National and Nomadic Guard

Chile
Military of Chile
Chilean Army
Chilean Navy
Chilean Air Force

China
People's Liberation Army
People's Liberation Army Ground Force
People's Liberation Army Air Force
People's Liberation Army Navy
People's Liberation Army Rocket Force
People's Liberation Army Strategic Support Force

Taiwan
See #Taiwan (Republic of China) below

Colombia
Military Forces of Colombia
National Army of Colombia
Colombian Navy
Colombian Air Force
National Police of Colombia

Comoros
Military of the Comoros
Comoros Air Force
Comorian People's Army

Democratic Republic of the Congo
Armed Forces of the Democratic Republic of the Congo
Air Force of the Democratic Republic of the Congo
Land Forces of the Democratic Republic of the Congo
Navy of the Democratic Republic of the Congo
Republican Guard

Republic of the Congo
Armed Forces of the Republic of the Congo
Congolese Air Force

Croatia
Armed Forces of Croatia
Croatian Army
Croatian Navy
Croatian Air Force

Cuba
Cuban Revolutionary Armed Forces
Cuban Revolutionary Army
Cuban Revolutionary Navy
Cuban Revolutionary Air and Air Defense Force
National Revolutionary Militia
Territorial Troops Militia

Cyprus
Cypriot National Guard
Cyprus Army
Cyprus Air Forces
Cyprus Navy

Czech Republic
Army of the Czech Republic
Czech Air Force
Czech Land Forces
Prague Castle Guard

D

Denmark
Danish Defence
Royal Danish Army
Royal Danish Air Force
Royal Danish Navy
Home Guard

Djibouti
Djibouti Armed Forces
Djibouti Air Force
Djiboutian Army
Djiboutian Navy
Djiboutian National Gendarmerie

Dominican Republic
Armed Forces of the Dominican Republic
Dominican Army
Dominican Air Force
Dominican Navy

E

East Timor
Timor Leste Defence Force

Ecuador
Armed Forces of Ecuador
Ecuadorian Army
Ecuadorian Air Force
Ecuadorian Navy

Egypt
Egyptian Armed Forces
Egyptian Army
Egyptian Air Force
Egyptian Navy
Egyptian Air Defense Forces

El Salvador
Armed Forces of El Salvador
Salvadoran Army
Navy of El Salvador
Salvadoran Air Force

Equatorial Guinea
Armed Forces of Equatorial Guinea
Navy of Equatorial Guinea
Army of Equatorial Guinea
Air Force of Equatorial Guinea

Eritrea
Eritrean Defence Forces
Eritrean Army
Eritrean Air Force
Eritrean Navy

Estonia
Estonian Defence Forces
Estonian Land Forces
Estonian Air Force
Estonian Navy
Estonian Defence League

Ethiopia
Ethiopian National Defense Force
Ethiopian Ground Forces
Ethiopian Air Force

F

Fiji
Republic of Fiji Military Forces
Fiji Infantry Regiment
Republic of Fiji Navy

Finland
Finnish Defence Forces
Finnish Army
Finnish Air Force
Finnish Navy

France
French Armed Forces
French Army
French Air and Space Force
French Navy
National Gendarmerie
National Guard

G

Gabon
Armed Forces of Gabon
Gabonese Army
Gabonese Air Force
Gabonese Navy
National Gendarmerie of Gabon
Gabonese Republican Guard

Gambia
Gambia Armed Forces
Gambia National Army
Gambia Navy
Gambia Air Force
National Republican Guard

Georgia
Defense Forces of Georgia
Georgian Land Forces
Georgian Air Force
Coast Guard of Georgia
Georgian Special Operations Forces
National Guard of Georgia

Germany
Bundeswehr
German Army
German Navy
German Air Force
Joint Support Service
Joint Medical Service
Cyber and Information Domain Service

Ghana
Ghana Armed Forces
Ghana Army
Ghana Air Force
Ghana Navy

Greece
Hellenic Armed Forces
Hellenic Army
Hellenic Navy
Hellenic Air Force

Grenada
Coast Guard of Grenada

Guatemala
Armed Forces of Guatemala
Guatemalan Air Force
Presidential Honor Guard

Guinea
Republic of Guinea Armed Forces
People's Army of Guinea
Guinea Air Force
Guinea Navy
Republican Guard

Guinea-Bissau
Military of Guinea-Bissau
Guinea-Bissau Army
Guinea-Bissau Air Force
Guinea-Bissau Navy

Guyana
Guyana Defence Force

H

Haiti
Armed Forces of Haiti

Honduras
Armed Forces of Honduras
Honduran Air Force

Hungary
Hungarian Defence Forces
Hungarian Ground Forces
Hungarian Air Force

I

India
Indian Armed Forces
Indian Army
Indian Air Force
Indian Navy

Indonesia
Indonesian National Armed Forces (TNI)
Indonesian Army
Indonesian Navy
Indonesian Air Force

Iraq
Iraqi Armed Forces
Iraqi Army
Iraqi Air Force
Iraqi Navy

Iran
Islamic Republic of Iran Armed Forces
Islamic Republic of Iran Army
Islamic Republic of Iran Army Ground Forces
Islamic Republic of Iran Air Force
Islamic Republic of Iran Air Defense Force 
Islamic Republic of Iran Navy
Islamic Revolutionary Guard Corps
Islamic Revolutionary Guard Corps Ground Forces 
Islamic Revolutionary Guard Corps Aerospace Force 
Islamic Revolutionary Guard Corps Navy
Basij
Quds Force
Islamic Republic of Iran Law Enforcement Command

Ireland
Defence Forces
Irish Army
Irish Air Corps
Irish Naval Service

Israel
Israel Defense Forces
Israeli Ground Forces
Israeli Air Force
Israeli Navy

Italy
Italian Armed Forces
Italian Army
Italian Navy
Italian Air Force
Carabinieri

Ivory Coast
Armed Forces of the Republic of Ivory Coast

J

Jamaica
Jamaica Defence Force

Japan
Japan Self-Defense Forces
Japan Ground Self-Defense Force
Japan Maritime Self-Defense Force
Japan Air Self-Defense Force

Jordan
Jordanian Armed Forces
Royal Jordanian Land Force
Royal Jordanian Air Force
Royal Jordanian Navy

K

Kazakhstan
Armed Forces of the Republic of Kazakhstan
Kazakh Ground Forces
Kazakh Air Defense Forces
Kazakh Naval Forces

Kenya
Kenya Defence Forces
Kenya Army
Kenya Air Force
Kenya Navy

North Korea
Korean People's Army
Korean People's Army Ground Force
Korean People's Army Air and Anti-Air Force
Korean People's Army Naval Force
Korean People's Army Strategic Force
Korean People's Army Special Operation Force
Worker-Peasant Red Guards

South Korea
Republic of Korea Armed Forces
Republic of Korea Army
Republic of Korea Air Force
Republic of Korea Navy

Kuwait
Kuwait Military Forces
Kuwaiti Army
Kuwait Air Force
Kuwait Naval Force
Paramilitary Forces of Kuwait
Kuwait National Guard

Kyrgyzstan
Armed Forces of the Republic of Kyrgyzstan
Kyrgyz Air Force
Kyrgyz Army
Kyrgyz National Guard
Kyrgyzstan Frontier Force

L

Laos
Lao People's Armed Forces
Lao People's Liberation Army Air Force
Lao People's Navy

Latvia
Latvian National Armed Forces
Latvian Land Forces
Latvian Naval Forces
Latvian Air Force
Latvian National Guard

Lebanon
Lebanese Armed Forces
Lebanese Army
Lebanese Air Force
Lebanese Navy
Lebanese Special Operations Command

Lesotho
Military of Lesotho
Lesotho Defence Force
Lesotho Defence Force – Air Squadron

Liberia
Armed Forces of Liberia
Liberian National Coast Guard

Libya

Libyan Armed Forces - (Government of National Accord)
Libyan Army
Libyan Air Force
Libyan Navy

Libyan National Army - (House of Representatives)
Libyan Air Force
Libyan Navy

Lithuania
Lithuanian Armed Forces
Lithuanian Land Force
Lithuanian Air Force
Lithuanian Naval Force
Lithuanian Special Operations Force

Luxembourg
Luxembourg Army

M

Madagascar
Madagascar People’s Armed Forces
Malagasy Air Force
Malagasy National Navy
Malagasy Army
Malagasy National Gendarmerie

Malawi
Malawian Defence Force

Malaysia
Malaysian Armed Forces
Malaysian Army
Royal Malaysian Air Force
Royal Malaysian Navy
Royal Johor Military Force
JMF Elite Forces

Maldives
Maldives National Defence Force
Maldivian Coast Guard
Maldivian Coast Guard Air Elements
MNDF Marine Corps
Special Forces (Maldives)

Mali
Military of Mali
Mali Air Force
Malian Army
Mali Republican Guard

Malta
Armed Forces of Malta
Air Wing of the Armed Forces of Malta
Maritime Squadron of the Armed Forces of Malta

Mauritania
Military of Mauritania
Paramilitary Forces of Mauritania
National Guard

Mauritius
Military of Mauritius
Special Mobile Force

Mexico
Mexican Armed Forces
Mexican Army
Mexican Air Force
Mexican Navy

Republic of Moldova
Military of Moldova
Moldovan Ground Forces
Moldovan Air Force

Monaco
Military of Monaco
Compagnie des Carabiniers du Prince

Mongolia
Mongolian Armed Forces
Mongolian Air Force
Mongolian General Purpose Force

Montenegro
Military of Montenegro
Montenegrin Ground Army
Montenegrin Navy
Montenegrin Air Force

Morocco
Royal Moroccan Armed Forces
Royal Moroccan Army
Royal Moroccan Navy
Royal Moroccan Air Force

Mozambique
Mozambique Defence Armed Forces

Myanmar
Tatmadaw
Myanmar Army
Myanmar Air Force
Myanmar Navy

N

Namibia
Namibian Defence Force
Namibian Air Force
Namibian Army
Namibian Navy

Netherlands
Armed forces of the Netherlands
Royal Netherlands Army
Royal Netherlands Air Force
Royal Netherlands Navy

Nepal
Nepalese Armed Forces
Nepal Army
Armed Police Force

New Zealand
New Zealand Defence Force
New Zealand Army
Royal New Zealand Air Force
Royal New Zealand Navy

Nicaragua
Military of Nicaragua
Nicaraguan Air Force
Nicaraguan Navy

Niger
Niger Armed Forces
Gendarmerie Nationale
National Guard of Niger

Nigeria
Nigerian Armed Forces
Nigerian Army
Nigerian Air Force
Nigerian Navy

North Macedonia
Army of the Republic of North Macedonia
Macedonian Air Force

Norway
Norwegian Armed Forces
Norwegian Army
Royal Norwegian Air Force
Royal Norwegian Navy
Home Guard

O

Oman
Sultan of Oman's Armed Forces
Royal Air Force of Oman
Royal Army of Oman
Royal Navy of Oman
Royal Guard of Oman
Royal Oman Police
Sultan's Special Forces

P

Pakistan
Pakistan Armed Forces
Pakistan Army
Pakistan Air Force
Pakistan Navy

Palestine
Palestinian Security Services
Palestinian National Security Forces

Papua New Guinea
Papua New Guinea Defence Force

Paraguay
Armed Forces of Paraguay
Paraguayan Army
Paraguayan Air Force

Peru
Peruvian Armed Forces
Joint Command of the Armed Forces of Peru
Peruvian Army
Peruvian Air Force
Peruvian Navy

Philippines
Armed Forces of the Philippines
Philippine Army
Philippine Air Force
Philippine Navy

Poland
Polish Armed Forces
Polish Land Forces
Polish Air Force
Polish Navy
Polish Special Forces
Territorial Defence Force

Portugal
Portuguese Armed Forces
Portuguese Army
Portuguese Navy
Portuguese Air Force

Q

Qatar
Qatar Armed Forces
Qatar Air Force
Qatari Emiri Navy

R

Romania
Romanian Armed Forces
Romanian Land Forces
Romanian Air Force
Romanian Naval Forces

Russia
Russian Armed Forces
Russian Aerospace Forces
Russian Air Force
Russian Space Forces
Russian Airborne Forces
Russian Ground Forces
Russian Navy
Strategic Missile Forces

Rwanda
Rwandan Defence Forces
Rwandan Air Force

S

Saint Kitts and Nevis
Saint Kitts and Nevis Defence Force

San Marino
Military of San Marino

Sao Tome and Principe
Military of São Tomé and Príncipe
Army of São Tomé and Príncipe
Coast Guard of São Tomé and Príncipe
Air Force of São Tomé and Príncipe
São Tomé Presidential Guard

Saudi Arabia
Royal Saudi Arabian Military Forces
Royal Saudi Land Force
Royal Saudi Air Force
Royal Saudi Naval Forces
Royal Saudi Air Defense Force
Royal Saudi Strategic Missile Force

Senegal
Armed Forces of Senegal
Senegalese Air Force

Serbia
Serbian Armed Forces
Serbian Army
Serbian Air Force and Air Defence
Serbian Training Command

Seychelles
Seychelles People's Defence Force
Seychelles Coast Guard
Seychelles Air Force

Sierra Leone
Republic of Sierra Leone Armed Forces

Singapore
Singapore Armed Forces
Singapore Army
Republic of Singapore Navy
Republic of Singapore Air Force
Digital and Intelligence Service

Slovakia
Slovak Armed Forces
Ground Forces of the Slovak Republic
Slovak Air Force

Slovenia
Slovenian Armed Forces
Slovenian Ground Force
Slovenian Air Force and Air Defence
Slovenian Navy

Somalia
Somali Armed Forces
Somali National Army
Somali Navy
Somali Air Force

South Africa
South African National Defence Force
South African Army
South African Air Force
South African Navy
South African Military Health Service

South Sudan
South Sudan People's Defense Forces
South Sudan Air Force

Spain
Spanish Armed Forces
Spanish Army
Spanish Air and Space Force
Spanish Navy
Spanish Royal Guard
Military Emergencies Unit

Sri Lanka
Sri Lanka Armed Forces
Sri Lanka Army
Sri Lanka Navy
Sri Lanka Air Force

Sudan
Sudanese Armed Forces
Popular Defence Forces
Republican Guard (Sudan)
Sudanese Air Force

Suriname
Suriname National Army
Suriname Air Force

Swaziland
Military of Swaziland

Sweden
Swedish Armed Forces
Swedish Army
Swedish Air Force
Swedish Navy
Home Guard

Switzerland
Swiss Armed Forces
Swiss Land Forces
Swiss Air Force
Special Forces Command

Syria
Syrian Armed Forces
Syrian Army
Syrian Air Force
Syrian Navy
Syrian Air Defense Force

T

Tajikistan
Armed Forces of the Republic of Tajikistan
Tajik National Army
Tajik Mobile Forces
Presidential National Guard
Tajik Air Force
Tajik Border Troops
Tajik Internal Troops

Tanzania
Tanzania People's Defence Force
Tanzania Air Force Command
Tanzania Naval Command

Thailand
Royal Thai Armed Forces
Royal Thai Army
Royal Thai Air Force
Royal Thai Navy

Togo
Togolese Armed Forces
Gendarmerie Nationale Togolaise

Tonga
His Majesty's Armed Forces (Tonga)
Tongan Maritime Force
Tonga Defence Services aviation

Trinidad and Tobago
Trinidad and Tobago Defence Force
Trinidad and Tobago Regiment

Tunisia
Tunisian Armed Forces
Tunisian Army
Tunisian Air Force
Tunisian Navy

Turkey
Turkish Armed Forces
Turkish Land Forces
Turkish Air Force
Turkish Naval Forces

Turkmenistan
Armed Forces of Turkmenistan
Turkmen Air Force
Turkmen Ground Forces
Turkmen Naval Forces

U

Uganda
Uganda People's Defence Force

Ukraine
Armed Forces of Ukraine
General Staff of the Ukrainian Armed Forces
Ukrainian Ground Forces
Ukrainian Air Force
Ukrainian Navy
Ukrainian Air Assault Forces
Special Forces of Ukraine

United Arab Emirates
Union Defence Force
United Arab Emirates Army
United Arab Emirates Navy
United Arab Emirates Air Force

United Kingdom
British Armed Forces
British Army
Royal Air Force
Royal Navy

United States
United States Armed Forces
United States Army
United States Marine Corps
United States Navy
United States Air Force
United States Space Force
United States Coast Guard

Uruguay
Armed Forces of Uruguay
National Army of Uruguay
National Navy of Uruguay
Uruguayan Air Force

Uzbekistan
Armed Forces of the Republic of Uzbekistan
Uzbekistan Ground Forces
Uzbekistan Air and Air Defence Forces
Uzbekistan Naval Forces
Uzbekistan National Guard
Frontier Service

V

Vanuatu 
Military of Vanuatu
Vanuatu Mobile Forces

Vatican City
Military of the Vatican City
Corps of Gendarmerie of Vatican City
Pontifical Swiss Guard

Venezuela 
National Armed Forces of the Bolivarian Republic of Venezuela
Venezuelan Army
Venezuelan Air Force
Bolivarian Navy of Venezuela
Venezuelan National Guard
Venezuelan National Militia

Vietnam 
Vietnam People's Armed Forces
Vietnam People's Army
Vietnam People's Ground Force
Vietnam People's Navy
Vietnam People's Air Force
Vietnam Border Guard
Vietnam Coast Guard
Vietnam People's Public Security
 Vietnam People's Police
 Vietnam People's Security
Vietnam Self-Defence Militia

Y

Yemen
Republic of Yemen Armed Forces
Yemeni Air Force
Yemeni Navy

Z

Zambia
Zambian Defence Force
Zambia Army
Zambian Air Force

Zimbabwe
Zimbabwe Defence Forces
Zimbabwe National Army
Air Force of Zimbabwe

List of militaries by dependencies and other territories

Abkhazia
Military of Abkhazia
Abkhazian Air Force
Abkhazian Navy

Republic of Artsakh
Artsakh Defense Army

Aruba
Military of Aruba

Bermuda
Military of Bermuda
Royal Bermuda Regiment

British Virgin Islands
Military of the British Virgin Islands

Cayman Islands
Military of the Cayman Islands
Cayman Islands Regiment

Netherlands Dutch Caribbean
Dutch Caribbean Coast Guard

Falkland Islands
Military of the Falkland Islands
Falkland Islands Defence Force

Gibraltar
British Forces Gibraltar
Royal Gibraltar Regiment
Gibraltar Squadron
Gibraltar Defence Police

Iraqi Kurdistan
Peshmerga
Zeravani

Kosovo
Kosovo Security Force

Montserrat
Royal Montserrat Defence Force

Northern Cyprus
Security Forces Command

Puntland
Puntland Security Force
Puntland Dervish Force
Puntland Maritime Police Force

Syria
Syrian Democratic Forces
People's Protection Units
Self-Defense Forces
United Freedom Forces
Paramilitary Forces 
Khabour Guards
Free Syrian Army
Syrian National Army

Sahrawi Arab Democratic Republic
Sahrawi People's Liberation Army

Somaliland
Somaliland Armed Forces

South Ossetia
Military of South Ossetia

Taiwan (Republic of China)
Republic of China Armed Forces
Republic of China Army
Republic of China Air Force
Republic of China Navy
Republic of China Military Police

Transnistria
Armed Forces of Transnistria

Turks and Caicos
Turks and Caicos Islands Regiment

See also
List of countries by number of military and paramilitary personnel
List of countries without armed forces
List of militaries that recruit foreigners
List of armies by country
List of navies
List of air forces
List of gendarmeries
List of space forces
List of military special forces units
List of active rebel groups
List of ongoing armed conflicts

External links
Countries Ranked by Military Strength

 
 
.